The Santee chub (Cyprinella zanema) is a species of fish in the family Cyprinidae. It is endemic to the United States,  where it occurs in the Cape Fear, Pee Dee, and upper Santee river drainages in North and South Carolina.

References

Cyprinella
Taxa named by David Starr Jordan
Taxa named by A. W. Brayton
Fish described in 1878